There have been two baronetcies created for persons with the surname Brydges, one in the Baronetage of England and one in the Baronetage of the United Kingdom. Both creations are extinct.

The Brydges Baronetcy, of Wilton in the County of Hereford, was created in the Baronetage of England on 17 May 1627. For more information on this creation, see Duke of Chandos.

The Brydges, later Egerton-Barrett-Brydges Baronetcy, of Denton Court in the County of Kent, was created in the Baronetage of the United Kingdom on 27 May 1815. For more information on this creation, see Egerton-Barrett-Brydges baronets.

Brydges baronets, of Wilton (1627)

Sir Giles Brydges, 1st Baronet (c. 1573–1637) 	
Sir John Brydges, 2nd Baronet (1623–1652)
Sir James Brydges, 3rd Baronet (1642–1714) (succeeded as 8th Baron Chandos in 1676)
For further succession, see Duke of Chandos

Brydges, later Egerton-Barrett-Brydges baronets, of Denton Court (1815)
see Egerton-Barrett-Brydges baronets

See also
Jones-Brydges baronets

References

Extinct baronetcies in the Baronetage of England
Extinct baronetcies in the Baronetage of the United Kingdom